Mataeomera is a genus of moths of the family Erebidae erected by Arthur Gardiner Butler in 1886. It is considered by some sources to be a synonym of Autoba.

Taxonomy
The genus has previously been classified in the subfamily Eustrotiinae of the family Noctuidae.

Species
 Mataeomera acrosticha Turner, 1920
 Mataeomera anaemacta Turner, 1920
 Mataeomera biangulata Wileman, 1915
 Mataeomera brevipalpis Turner, 1945
 Mataeomera coccophaga Meyrick, 1887
 Mataeomera dubia Butler, 1886
 Mataeomera duporti de Joannis, 1928
 Mataeomera goniaphora Hampson, 1920
 Mataeomera ligata Lucas, 1895
 Mataeomera melanocephala Wileman & West, 1929
 Mataeomera mesotaenia Turner, 1929
 Mataeomera obliquisigna Hampson, 1894
 Mataeomera porphyris Turner, 1920
 Mataeomera punctilinea Turner, 1945
 Mataeomera renalis Hampson, 1918
 Mataeomera semialba Hampson, 1902
 Mataeomera sumbavensis Hampson, 1910

References

Boletobiinae
Noctuoidea genera